Kellen Briggs (born June 28, 1983) is an American former professional ice hockey goaltender.

Playing career
Briggs graduated from Roosevelt High School in Sioux Falls, South Dakota. He played three seasons with the USHL's Sioux Falls Stampede, where he led the USHL in saves (1,422) and total minutes played (2,529).

He spent the next four years (2003–2007) tending goal for the Minnesota Golden Gophers. He recorded 25 wins in his first year, which set the school record for a freshman. His sophomore year, he went with the team to the Frozen Four, and was co-recipient of the John Mariucci team MVP award.

Briggs' senior year at the University of Minnesota, he served as alternate team captain. He was the first goaltender since 1973 to receive that honor. He helped the Golden Gophers win the McNaughton Cup and the Broadmoor Trophy in 2007. He also holds the school record for most wins in a career (84), and most shutouts in a career (13).

In October 2007, Briggs played in his first professional game with the Idaho Steelheads. He was picked to play in the 2007 National Conference All-Star game in the ECHL, and had his first American Hockey League call-up when he was loaned to the Rockford IceHogs though he didn't get to play on ice. He moved to the Ontario Reign in 2008 which was followed by a spell in the AHL for the Portland Pirates. He then moved to Germany in the 2nd Bundesliga with Dresdner Eislöwen before returning to the Ontario Reign in 2010.

Career statistics

Awards and honors

References

External links

1983 births
American men's ice hockey goaltenders
Dresdner Eislöwen players
Heilbronner EC players
Idaho Steelheads (ECHL) players
Living people
Minnesota Golden Gophers men's ice hockey players
Portland Pirates players
Ontario Reign (ECHL) players
Sportspeople from Colorado Springs, Colorado
Sioux Falls Stampede players
Ice hockey players from Colorado